Telesistema Mexicano was the predecessor of Televisa. Telesistema Mexicano was a television alliance made up of the independently owned television flagship stations XEW Canal 2, XHTV Canal 4, and XHGC Canal 5 in Mexico, Distrito Federal.

History
Telesistema Mexicano was founded in 1955 when Mexico, Distrito Federal television stations XEW Canal 2 owned by Emilio Azcárraga Vidaurreta, XHTV Canal 4 owned by Rómulo O'Farrill, XHGC Canal 5 owned by Guillermo González Camarena, and capital and expertise from Ernesto Barrientos Ventosa merged to form an alliance. In 1968 Monterrey businessmen established Televisión Independiente de México XHTM Canal 8 in Mexico, Distrito Federal to compete with Telesistema Mexico but later ended up being merged with their competitor in 1973. This last merger between Telesistema de Mexico and Televisión Independiente de México led to the creation of Television Via Satellite (Televisa).

References

Televisa
1955 establishments in Mexico
1973 disestablishments in Mexico